King of the Wild Horses may refer to:

The King of Wild Horses, 1924 American silent Western film directed by Fred Jackman
King of the Wild Horses (1933 film), American Western directed by Earl Haley
King of the Wild Horses (1947 film), American Western directed by George Archainbaud